Mute is an upcoming Spanish psychological thriller television series created by Aitor Gabilondo which stars Arón Piper.

Plot 
The plot tracks the plight of reinserted parricide Sergio Ciscar, under the secret watch of young psychiatrist Ana Dussuel and her team.

Cast

Production 
Created by Aitor Gabilondo, Mute is an Alea Media production for Netflix. Shooting locations included Madrid and Bilbao.

Release 
Netflix is scheduled to release the series in May 2023.

References 

Psychological thriller television series
Upcoming television series
Spanish thriller television series
Television shows filmed in Spain
Upcoming Netflix original programming